Dragana Potpara (born 1977) is a politician and administrator in Serbia. She served in the Assembly of Vojvodina from 2016 to 2020 and is now a secretary of state in Serbia's ministry of public administration and local self-government. Potpara is a member of the Serbian Progressive Party.

Early life and career
Potpara attained the title of master economist from a private university in Novi Sad. She has directed an environmental protection fund and was head of the municipal department of social activities in Kula, Vojvodina, where she resides.

Politician
Potpara received the fifty-second position on the Progressive Party's electoral list in the 2016 Vojvodina provincial election and was elected when the list won a majority victory with sixty-three out of 120 mandates. She was a member of the committee on budget and finance and the committee on education and science. She did not seek re-election in 2020.

Secretary of State
Potpara was appointed as a secretary of state in Serbia's the department of public administration and local self-government in early 2021.

References

1977 births
Living people
People from Kula, Serbia
Members of the Assembly of Vojvodina
Serbian Progressive Party politicians